Major-General Ronald Okeden Alexander  (7 August 1888 – 28 July 1949) was a military officer in the Canadian Army, a District Officer, Commanding District No.4, Montreal (1936–38), Number 2 Toronto (1938–40) and Inspector General  for Central Canada (1942–46).  He commanded the Western coast defences of Canada during World War II.

Military career
Alexander was the son of J.A. Alexander, Indian Civil Service, and was born in Kandy, Ceylon on 7 August 1888.  He was educated at Bedford Modern School, On 21 June 1910 he was commissioned as an officer into The Royal Canadian Regiment.

During World War I he was mentioned in despatches three times throughout the conflict and was awarded the Distinguished Service Order in 1917.

Remaining in the army during the interwar period, where he attended the Staff College, Camberley and then served as Professor of Tactics at the Royal Military College of Canada from September 1924−December 1927, he also active during World War II he was Inspector General of the armed forces in Central Canada and was a made a Companion of the Order of the Bath in 1944.  He died at Saanich, British Columbia on 27 July 1949.

References

External links
Ronald Okeden Alexander fonds at University of Victoria Special Collections and University Archives
Canadian Army Officers 1939–1945
Generals of World War II

1888 births
1949 deaths
Canadian generals
Canadian Companions of the Distinguished Service Order
Canadian Companions of the Order of the Bath
Sri Lankan people of Canadian descent
People from British Ceylon
People educated at Bedford Modern School
Canadian Expeditionary Force officers
Canadian Army generals of World War II
Canadian military personnel of World War I
Graduates of the Staff College, Camberley
Canadian Militia officers
Academic staff of the Royal Military College of Canada
Royal Canadian Regiment officers